The northern emerald (Somatochlora arctica) is a middle-sized species of dragonfly first described by Johan Wilhelm Zetterstedt in 1840. The male can be recognised by its pincer-like appendages and its narrow-waisted body. The female has distinctive orange-yellow spots on (only) the third segment of the abdomen.

This species lives in bogs and lays its eggs in very small water-filled depressions. It hunts between trees and avoids open spaces.

In Great Britain, it is only present in north-western Scotland and is confined to the south-western part of Ireland. It is present in all of northern Eurasia. In Western Europe, it is present in alpine areas and wherever a suitable habitat can be found. It is found in the Rila mountains of Bulgaria.

References

Corduliidae
Dragonflies of Europe
Insects described in 1840